Linas Vodopjanovas (born 1973 in Neringa Municipality) is a Lithuanian clergyman and bishop for the Roman Catholic Diocese of Panevėžys. He was ordained in 2000. He was appointed bishop in 2016.

References 

1973 births
Living people
Lithuanian Roman Catholic bishops
People from Klaipėda County